"Super Trouper" is a song by the Swedish pop group ABBA, and the title track from their 1980 studio album of the same name, written by Benny Andersson and Björn Ulvaeus. It was released in November 1980 as the album's third single. The song – with lead vocals by Anni-Frid Lyngstad – had the working title "Blinka Lilla Stjärna" (i.e. Twinkle Little Star, in Swedish), and was the last track to be written and recorded for the album (ultimately replacing the track "Put On Your White Sombrero"). 

The song's name refers to the Super Trouper, a make of followspot used in large venues.

Lyrics
The first verse contains the line, "I was sick and tired of everything when you called me last night from Glasgow". In February 2020, saxophonist Ulf Andersson, who toured with ABBA in the late 1970s, revealed that name-checking Glasgow was a coded love note from Bjorn Ulvaeus to then-wife Agnetha Faltskog. "It was a personal thing between Bjorn and Agnetha," he told the Scottish Mail on Sunday. "Bjorn was in Glasgow for some Abba promotion. It was around the time they were about to separate. He wrote the lyrics and Agnetha sings it, but really it was meant to be from him.".  However as the lyric was written 10 months after they had split up and Frida sings the line this cannot be true.

Reception
"Super Trouper" is an upbeat pop rock, disco 1980s track. It continued ABBA's run of chart success, particularly in Europe. It become ABBA's ninth (and final) No. 1 in the United Kingdom. This distinction placed ABBA fourth for the most UK chart-toppers in history (behind The Beatles, Elvis Presley and Cliff Richard); a position the group would keep for almost 20 years until Madonna scored her tenth UK No. 1 with "Music" in August 2000. The track was also the fourth biggest selling single in the UK for 1980. "Super Trouper" also topped the charts in Belgium, West Germany, Ireland and the Netherlands, and was a Top 10 hit in Austria, Finland, France, Norway, Spain and Switzerland.

Outside of Europe, "Super Trouper" was a more modest hit. For example, in the United States, where ABBA never attained quite the popularity experienced elsewhere, the single reached No. 45. However, combined with "Lay All Your Love on Me" and "On and On and On", it topped the US Hot Dance Club Play chart in May 1981. The song reached the lower regions of the charts in countries such as Australia and Japan, but in Mexico it reached No. 3.

The recording sold 709,000 copies in United Kingdom in 1980 alone. As of September 2021, it is the group's second biggest song in the country with 1.05 million chart sales, made up of 978,000 pure sales and 38 million streams.

Record World said that the song "deals with onstage loneliness" and that "engaging vocal interaction bounces resoundingly."

Music video
In October 1980, the music video for "Super Trouper" used the largest number of artists that ABBA ever used in a music video, including a full circus troupe. The spotlight featured throughout the video is, in fact, a CCT Silhouette profile spot with followspot kit, as opposed to a real Super Trouper. The city of Glasgow mentioned in the lyric was suggested by Howard Huntridge who worked with their then-UK publishers Bocu Music. The music video was directed by Lasse Hallström. Parts of the video were later reused in the clip for the song "Happy New Year" (which also features on the Super Trouper album).

Personnel
 Anni-Frid Lyngstad – lead vocals 
 Agnetha Fältskog – background vocals
 Benny Andersson – keyboards, synthesizer
 Björn Ulvaeus – guitar

Additional musicians
 Janne Schaffer – lead guitar
 Mike Watson – bass guitar
 Per Lindvall – drums
 Åke Sundqvist – percussion

Charts

Weekly charts

Year-end charts

Certifications and sales

A-Teens version

"Super Trouper" was A-Teens' second single from their first album, The ABBA Generation (1999), a cover of ABBA's song. When the single came out in the fall of 1999, it became a hit around the globe, just as its predecessor "Mamma Mia", also an ABBA cover. "Super Trouper" debuted at No. 2 in Sweden and was later certified platinum.

It also became their only Top 5 hit in Germany peaking at No. 4. The single also reached No. 21 in the United Kingdom, No. 18 in Switzerland, No. 15 in Norway, No. 11 in Austria and No. 12 in the Netherlands.

Music video
The music video was directed by Sebastian Reed and was filmed in Sweden. The video shows a girl so obsessed with the band that she owns posters, magazines, mugs, clothing, and a key chain. She also copies the band's choreography that is shown on TV. Some of the articles that feature pictures of the band come to life in the video.

In the first few seconds of the video, before the actual song starts, Mamma Mia can be faintly heard in the background.

The video was a hit in most TV stations charting inside the Top 10 countdowns in late 1999 and early 2000.

Releases
 European 2-track CD single
"Super Trouper" (Radio Version) – 3:52
"Super Trouper" (Super Radio Remix) – 4:04

 European CD Maxi
"Super Trouper" (Radio Version) – 3:52
"Super Trouper" (Super Super Remix) – 8:58
"Super Trouper" (Pinocchio Remix) – 5:08
"Super Trouper" (Extended Version) – 6:05

 German CD Maxi (3 January 2000)
"Super Trouper" (Radio Version) – 3:52
"Super Trouper" (Perre J's Remix) – 4:04
"Happy New Year" – 4:23
"Mamma Mia" (Radio Version) – 3:43
Video: "Mamma Mia"

 UK CD1 (22 November 1999)
"Super Trouper" (Radio Version) – 3:52
"A*Teens Medley" (Pierre J's Full UK Mix) – 7:27
"Super Trouper" (Karaoke Version) – 3:52
Video: "Super Trouper"

 UK CD2 (22 November 1999)
"Super Trouper" (Extended Version) – 6:05
"Super Trouper" (W.I.P.) – 6:10
"Super Trouper" (The Bold & The Glamour Mix) – 6:50

 UK Cassette (22 November 1999)
"Super Trouper" (Radio Version) – 3:52
"Super Trouper" (Karaoke Version) – 3:52

 Japan CD Maxi (1 December 1999)
"Super Trouper" (Radio Version) – 3:52
"Happy New Year" – 4:23
"Super Trouper" (Super Super Remix) – 8:58
"Super Trouper" (Extended Version) – 6:05

 Sweden promo CD
"Super Trouper" (Radio Version) – 3:52

 12" vinyl promo (1-track)
 A. "Super Trouper" (Extended Version) – 6:05

 UK 12" vinyl promo (3-track) (22 November 1999)
 A1. "Super Trouper" (Extended Version) – 6:05
 B1. "Super Trouper" (The Bold & The Glamour Mix) – 6:50
 B2. "Super Trouper" (W.I.P.) – 6:10

Charts

Weekly charts

Year-end charts

Mamma Mia! Here We Go Again version
Super Trouper was released on 13 July 2018, alongside the soundtrack of Mamma Mia! Here We Go Again, by Capitol and Polydor Records. The song is performed by the whole main cast (Christine Baranski, Pierce Brosnan, Cher, Dominic Cooper, Alexa Davies, Josh Dylan, Colin Firth, Andy García, Jeremy Irvine, Lily James, Amanda Seyfried, Stellan Skarsgård, Hugh Skinner, Meryl Streep, Julie Walters and Jessica Keenan Wynn) and it was produced by Benny Andersson. The song was also performed in the first film by Streep, Baranski, and Walters.

Charts

Appearances in other media
The song is performed in the Mamma Mia! stage musical, as well as the 2008 film adaptation. In the musical and film, Donna, Tanya and Rosie perform the song at Sophie's hen party dressed in the tight lycra suits they used to wear when they were a girl band called "Donna and the Dynamos". In the context of the musical, it explains that even though Donna has a hard life sometimes, all she has to know to feel better is that Sophie is there. When Niklas Strömstedt wrote lyrics for the Swedish staging of the musical, "Glasgow" was replaced by "Gränna" as the place from which the singer calls in the lyrics.

References

1980 songs
1980 singles
ABBA songs
Songs written by Benny Andersson and Björn Ulvaeus
UK Singles Chart number-one singles
European Hot 100 Singles number-one singles
Number-one singles in Germany
Irish Singles Chart number-one singles
Dutch Top 40 number-one singles
Number-one singles in Belgium
Number-one singles in Zimbabwe
1999 singles
A-Teens songs
Glasgow
Music videos directed by Lasse Hallström
Polar Music singles
Epic Records singles
Universal Music Group singles